Cirsotrema zelebori, common name : the slender wentletrap, is species of very small deepwater sea snail, a marine gastropod mollusk in the family Epitoniidae, the wentletraps.

Description
The shell size varies between 12 mm and 25 mm

Distribution
This species is endemic to the seas off the southern islands of New Zealand

References

 Powell A W B, New Zealand Mollusca, William Collins Publishers Ltd, Auckland, New Zealand 1979

External links
 

Epitoniidae
Gastropods of New Zealand
Gastropods described in 1866